Plagiopholis styani, also known by the common name Chinese mountain snake, is a species of colubrid snake. Its type locality is Kuatun (Guadun in modern spelling) in Wuyishan, Fujian. It is found in southern and central China, Taiwan, and northern Vietnam. It is an uncommon species, and very rare in Taiwan. It is named after Frederick William Styan, a Shanghai-based English tea merchant and ornithologist.

Description
Its upper head, body and tail are red-brown, olive-brown, or green-brown, with flecks of pink or black pigment on each scale, especially for those on the flanks of body. The upper body and tail have a spotted pattern of black or light yellow. There is a dark and thick cross band on nape, reflected in its Chinese name, Fujian neck-blotched snake.

Habitat and ecology
Plagiopholis styani occurs in areas of montane and bamboo forest, including caves. It is a nocturnal snake that eats mainly earthworms and arthropods. It uses its head to burrow. Females produce clutches of 5–11 eggs in summer.

References

Further reading
Boulenger GA (1899). "On a Collection of Reptiles and Batrachians made by Mr. J. D. La Touche in N.W. Fokien, China". Proceedings of the Zoological Society of London 1899: 159-172 + Plates XVI-XIX. (Trirhinopholis styani, new species, pp. 145–165 + Plate XVIII, figures 2, 2a).

Plagiopholis
Snakes of China
Snakes of Vietnam
Snakes of Asia
Reptiles of China
Reptiles of Taiwan
Reptiles of Vietnam
Reptiles described in 1899
Taxa named by George Albert Boulenger